Bellator 273: Bader vs. Moldavsky was a mixed martial arts event produced by Bellator MMA, it took place on January 29, 2022 at the Footprint Center in Phoenix, Arizona.

Background 
A winner in eight of his last 11 bouts, Bader will be making his return to the heavyweight division for the first time since 2019, Bader’s last title defense came against the Cheick Kongo at Bellator 226 , a bout Bader was controlling until an accidental eye poke prematurely ended the contest. Since then, Bader lost his 205-pound title against Vadim Nemkov before entering the light heavyweight grand prix where he defeated Lyoto Machida in April before suffering a KO loss to Corey Anderson in October at Bellator 268. Moldavsky, a protege of Fedor Emelianenko, became Bellator’s first-ever interim heavyweight champion with a unanimous decision win over Timothy Johnson at Bellator 261.

A middleweight bout between Romero Cotton and Dalton Rosta was scheduled for this event. However, two weeks before the event Cotton pulled out of the bout due to illness and was replaced by Duane Johnson.

A featherweight bout between Weber Almeida and Josh Wright was scheduled for this event, however it was scrapped due to unknown reasons. Fabricio Franco was instead booked against Weber.  At weigh ins, Franco came in 151.2 lb - 5.2 pounds over the featherweight weight limit, leading to the bout being scrapped.

Results

See also 

 2022 in Bellator MMA
 List of Bellator MMA events
 List of current Bellator fighters
 Bellator MMA Rankings

References 

Bellator MMA events
Events in Phoenix, Arizona
2022 in mixed martial arts
January 2022 sports events in the United States
2022 in sports in Arizona
Mixed martial arts in Arizona
Sports competitions in Arizona